Peter Kolosimo, pseudonym of Pier Domenico Colosimo (15 December 1922 – 23 March 1984), was an Italian journalist and writer. He is ranked amongst the founders of pseudoarchaeology (in Italian: fantarcheologia), a controversial topic in which interpretations of the past are made that are not accepted by the archaeological science community, which rejects the accepted data-gathering and analytical methods of the discipline. He also popularised ancient astronaut theories of contact between extraterrestrial beings and ancient human civilizations.

During the late 1950s and the 1960s, he was published in some of the first Italian science fiction magazines, such as Romanzi del Cosmo ("Cosmic Novels"), and his articles were regularly featured in the science/science fiction magazine Oltre il Cielo ("Beyond the Sky"). He published many more books, all widely popular and translated in 60 countries, including Russia, Japan, and China. In the 1970s and early 1980s until his death, he was the editor of many magazines, including Pi Kappa, a "fantarchaeologia" magazine covering the same topics that Kolosimo did in his books. In later life, he wrote a few books with his wife, Caterina, by whom he had a daughter, Alessandra (born 1970).

Kolosimo also founded and coordinated the Italian Association for Prehistoric Studies (ASP).

He died in Milan in 1984.

Reception

Kolosimo's claims about ancient astronauts influencing human civilizations are considered to be pseudohistory.

In a review of Kolosimo's Not of This World, Jason Colavito has alleged that the book fabricates evidence, mistranslates sources and conflates science fiction and fact.

Wu Ming, an Italy-based collective of writers, considered Kolosimo a "fellow novelist" and wrote about him on several occasions, including a story published in GQ (Italian edition), where they stated, "we like to think he just left the planet, and is still travelling across the universe." He is remembered lovingly as well by the writer Massimo Pietroselli in Fantascienza.com, an Italian science fiction online magazine, as a dreamer who was writing for the people, and encouraging the Soviet alternative to regular, conservative science, and did so successfully. Pagine 70, another Italian magazine, described Non è terrestre as his "first official revenge on the academic world" that tended to reject his ideas. The author goes on to describe Kolosimo as "an affable man, perhaps a great conversationalist, certainly an uncommon man." He describes Kolosimo’s work as undeterred against the repeated "snobbery of the academic world" and argues that it demonstrates that "imagination is a social weapon, which can break down regimes, give birth to states, and think … even manage to land on the moon."

Selected bibliography

Books 
Il pianeta sconosciuto (1957) 
Terra senza tempo (1964; translated into English as Timeless Earth) 
Ombre sulle stelle  (1966) 
Psicologia dell'eros (1967) 
Non è terrestre (1968; translated as Not of this World) 
Guida al mondo dei sogni (1968)
Il comportamento erotico degli europei (1970)
Cittadini delle tenebre (1971)
Astronavi sulla preistoria (1972; translated as Spaceships in Prehistory) 
Odissea stellare (1974) 
Fratelli dell'infinito (1975)
Polvere d'inferno (1975)
Italia mistero cosmico (1977) 
Civiltà del silenzio (1978)
Fiori di luna (1979)
Io e l'indiano (1979)
Viaggiatori del tempo (1981)
I misteri dell'universo (1982, with Caterina Kolosimo)

Novels 
Fronte del sole or I cavalieri delle stelle (From Outer Space; 1979, with Caterina Kolosimo)
Missione uomo (1982, with Oscar Warner)

Editor 
 Pi Kappa, rivista di mistero, archeologia ed esobiologia (director), I-II, (1972-1973)
 Dimensione X, enciclopedia del mistero (coordinator), 1-10, (1982)
 Italia misteriosa (editor, 1984)
 Scrutando nel futuro (editor, 1984)

References

External links
 UFOs and Revolution, an article on Kolosimo by Wu Ming, published on GQ magazine (Italian edition), July 2009.
 Review of Kolosimo's works 

1922 births
1984 deaths
Writers from Modena
Italian non-fiction writers
Italian male journalists
Ancient astronauts proponents
Pseudoarchaeologists
Pseudohistorians
20th-century Italian writers
20th-century Italian male writers
20th-century Italian journalists